Jasmina Cunmulaj (born August 12, 1997) is an American model, holding the title of Miss Michigan Earth 2016.

Pageantry
Miss Novi Teen USA 2015
(Top 15 at Miss Michigan Teen USA 2016)

Miss Michigan Earth 2016

Cunmulaj competed for Miss Earth United States in Washington, D.C., July 31-August 2, 2016, and won the title. She took part in Miss Michigan 2017.

References

1997 births
American female models
American people of Albanian descent
Living people
Miss Earth United States delegates
University of Detroit Mercy alumni
Place of birth missing (living people)
21st-century American women